Copidita is a genus of false blister beetles in the subfamily Oedemerinae. It is an extant genus with at least one fossil species described from the Florissant Eocene of Colorado.

References

External links 
 
 
 Copidita at insectoid.info

Oedemeridae
Tenebrionoidea genera